In Chinese philosophy, water is the low point of the matter, or the matter's dying or hiding stage. Water is the fifth stage of Wu Xing, the five elements.

Water is the most yin in character of the five elements. Its motion is downward and inward, and its energy is stillness and conserving.

Water is associated with the color black, with the planet Mercury, with the moon (which was believed to cause the dew to fall at night), with night, with the north, with winter or cold weather, and with the Black Tortoise (Xuan Wu) in the Chinese constellation Four Symbols.

Attributes
In Chinese Taoist thought, water is representative of intelligence and wisdom, flexibility, softness, and pliancy; however, an overabundance of the element is said to cause difficulty in choosing something and sticking to it. In the same way, water can be fluid and weak, but can also wield great power when it floods and overwhelms the land. In Chinese medicine, water is believed to govern the kidney and urinary bladder, and is associated with the ears and bones. The negative emotion associated with water is fear/anxiety, while the positive emotion is calmness.

The colours black, blue, and grey also represent water.

Astrology
In Chinese astrology, water is included in the 10 heavenly stems (the five elements in their yin and yang forms), which combine with the 12 Earthly Branches (or Chinese signs of the zodiac), to form the 60 year cycle.

Yang water years end in 2 (e.g., 1992), while yin water years end in 3 (e.g., 1993). Water governs the Chinese zodiac signs Pig and Rat. It also usually represents wealth and money luck in Feng Shui, although it might differ in some subjective scenarios.

Cycle of Wu Xing
In the regenerative cycle of the Wu Xing, metal engenders water, as it traps falling water from a source, and water begets wood as "rain or dew makes plant life flourish"

In the conquest cycle, water overcomes fire, as "nothing will put out a fire as quickly as water". Earth overcomes water as earth-built canals direct the flow, and soil absorbs water.

References

it:Acqua (elemento)#Tradizione cinese